The Viking 110 is a 110 hp aircraft engine that was developed from Honda Fit automotive engine components by Viking Aircraft Engines of Edgewater, Florida.

Design and development
The aluminum block Viking 110 has electronic ignition and multi-port fuel injection. It was introduced in 2009 and is based upon the 2009 model Honda Fit automotive engine. It produces  through a mechanical gear reduction drive with helical gears, with a reduction ratio of 2.33:1. A Warp Drive Inc propeller is recommended. The design was later developed into the Viking 130, producing  and which replaced the 110 in production.

Operational history
By August 2016 the company had delivered 100 engines and had 25 reported flying.

Applications
Just Highlander
Progressive Aerodyne SeaRey
Sonex Aircraft Sonex
Van's RV-12
Zenith CH-601
Zenith CH-650
Zenith CH-701
Zenith CH-750

Specifications (Viking 130)

See also

References

External links

 Official website

2000s aircraft piston engines